Valle Crucis is a Latin phrase meaning "valley of the cross", and may refer to:

Valle Crucis Abbey, Wales, UK
Valle Crucis, North Carolina, US
Valle Crucis Episcopal Mission, North Carolina, US